Bathynellidae is a family of crustaceans belonging to the order Bathynellacea, first described by Karl Grobben in 1905.

Genera

The World Register of Marine Species recognises the following genera in family Bathynellidae:

Agnathobathynella 
Antrobathynella 
Austrobathynella 
Baicalobathynella 
Bathynella 
Camachobathynella 
Clamousella 
Delamareibathynella 
Gallobathynella 
Hispanobathynella 
Hobbsinella 
Indobathynella 
Meridiobathynella 
Morimotobathynella 
Nannobathynella 
Nilobathynella 
Pacificabathynella 
Paradoxibathynella 
Paradoxiclamousella 
Parameridiobathynella 
Parauenobathynella 
Pseudantrobathynella 
Pseudobathynella 
Sardobathynella 
Serbanibathynella 
Tianschanobathynella 
Transkeithynella 
Transvaalthynella 
Uenobathynella 
Vandelibathynella 
Vejdovskybathynella 

Additional genera according to the Australian Faunal Directory:
Fortescuenella 
Pilbaranella

References

Syncarida
Crustacean families